Carex echinata is a species of sedge known by the common names star sedge and little prickly sedge.

Description
Carex echinata has a solid, ridged stem that may exceed  in height and it has a few thready leaves toward the base.

It is infected by the fungal species Anthracoidea karii.

Distribution
This plant is native to North and Central America and parts of Eurasia; as of 2016, it has spread as far as Taiwan. Carex echinata is a plant of wet forests, marshes, and mountain meadows of moderate elevation. It is commonly associated with peat bogs.

References

External links
Jepson Manual Treatment - Carex echinata
Carex echinata - Photo gallery on Calphotos

echinata
Flora of Europe
Flora of Turkey
Flora of the Caucasus
Flora of North America
Flora of Papua New Guinea
Flora of Australasia
Plants described in 1770
Taxa named by Johan Andreas Murray